Costigan is an Irish surname with higher concentrations in Counties Laois, Tipperary and Kilkenny.  Costigan is a branch of the Fitzpatricks (Mac Giolla Phádraig dynasty) of Upper Ossory, although the name may also independently derive from Hodgkin, a dimin. of Roger. Genetic evidence shows shared ancestry amongst Fitzpatricks and Costigans with ancestry in Upper Ossory Notable people with the surname include:

 Christopher Costigan, explorer of the Jordan River and Dead Sea in 1835
 Daniel Costigan (1911–1979), Commissioner of the Garda Síochána from 1952 to 1965
 Edward P. Costigan (1874–1939), US senator from Colorado
 Francis Costigan, early Indiana architect
 Frank Costigan, (1931–2009) Australian QC and commissioner in the Royal Commission on the activities of the Federated Ship Painters and Dockers Union (known as the Costigan Commission)
 Giovanni Costigan (1905–1985), historian
 George Costigan (born 1947), a British television actor
 Howard Costigan (1904–1985), American political functionary
 James Costigan, screenwriter
 Jason Costigan, Australian Liberal National politician and former rugby commentator
 John Edward Costigan, American artist
 John Costigan (hurler)
 Keith Costigan, former soccer player, and television sports analyst
Kyle Costigan, American Football Player, Strength and Conditioning Coach for the University of Wisconsin-Madison 
 Mabel Cory Costigan (1873–1951), on the advisory council of the National Child Labor Committee and vice president of the National Consumers League.
 Michael Costigan (entrepreneur)
 Michael Costigan (film producer)
 Michael Costigan (youth speaker)
 Neville Costigan, Australian rugby league footballer
 Peter Costigan, (1935–2002), Australian journalist, former Lord Mayor of Melbourne
 Sandra Costigan, former field hockey player

Fictional characters:
 Billy Costigan, a character in the Martin Scorsese film, The Departed, played by Leonardo DiCaprio
 Captain Costigan, a character in the novel Pendennis, by William Makepeace Thackeray.
 Sailor Steve Costigan, a character created by Robert E. Howard
 Conway Costigan, a character in E.E. Smith's Triplanetary
 Jerry, Grace and Russell Costigan, characters in Robert B. Parker's novel "A Catskill Eagle"
 Catta Costigan "stampatore in Florence"

See also
 Costigan, New Brunswick, Canada
 Costigan Commission, the Royal Commission on the Activities of the Federated Ship Painters and Dockers Union
 Mount Costigan, a summit in Alberta, Canada

References